Theodorias was a Byzantine province created in 528 by Emperor Justinian I and named in honour of his wife, the Empress Theodora.

History 
It comprised a small coastal territory taken from the earlier provinces of Syria Prima and Syria Secunda. The new province remained part of the Diocese of the East. Its capital was Laodicea (in Syria; now Latakia), and it also included the cities of Paltus (Arab al-Mulk), Balaneae and Gabala. Ecclesiastically, these cities retained their former allegiances to the metropolitan bishops of Syria Prima and Secunda: Antioch and Apamea in Syria.

References

Bibliography

Late Roman provinces
Provinces of the Byzantine Empire
Justinian I
States and territories established in the 520s
States and territories disestablished in the 7th century
7th-century disestablishments in the Byzantine Empire
Byzantine Syria